Melchora Aquino de Ramos (January 6, 1812 – February 19, 1919) was a Filipino revolutionary. She became known as "Tandang Sora" ("tandang" meaning "old") because of her age during the Philippine Revolution.

She was known as the "Grand Woman of the Revolution" and the "Mother of Balintawak" for her contributions.

Early life and marriage
Known as the "Mother of Revolution," Tandang Sora was born on January 6, 1812 in Barrio Banlat, Caloocan (the present-day Barangay Tandang Sora, Quezon City).

Tandang Sora, daughter of a peasant couple, Juan and Valentina Aquino, never attended school. However, she was apparently literate at an early age and talented as a singer and performed at local events as well as at Mass for her Church. She was also often chosen for the role of Reyna Elena during the "Santacruzan", a processional pageant commemorating Empress Helen's finding of the Cross of Christ, celebrated in the Philippines in May.

Later in life, she married Fulgencio Ramos, a cabeza de barrio (village chief), and bore six children. Ramos died when their youngest child was 7 and she was left as a single parent for their children. Tandang Sora continued her life as an hermana mayor active in celebrating fiestas, baptisms, and weddings. She worked hard in order to give her children education.

Involvement in the revolution
In her native town, Tandang Sora operated a store, which became a refuge for the sick and wounded revolutionaries. She fed, gave medical attention to and encouraged the revolutionaries with motherly advice and prayers.

Secret meetings of the Katipuneros (revolutionaries) were also held at her house in August 1896. Thus she earned the names "Woman of Revolution", "Mother of Balintawak", "Mother of the Philippine Revolution", and Tandang Sora (Tandang is derived from the Tagalog word matandâ, which means old). She and her son, Juan Ramos, were present in the Cry of Balintawak and were witnesses to the tearing up of the cedulas.

When the Spaniards learned about her activities and her knowledge to the whereabouts of the Katipuneros, she was arrested by the guardia civil on August 29, 1896. She was held captive in the house of a cabeza de barangay of Pasong Putik, Novaliches and then transferred to Bilibid Prison in Manila. While in prison, she was interrogated but she refused to divulge any information. She was then deported to Guam, Marianas Islands by Governor General Ramón Blanco on September 2. In Guam, she and a woman named Segunda Puentes were placed under house arrest in the residence of a Don Justo Dungca.

After the United States took control of the Philippines in 1898, Tandang Sora, like other exiles, returned to the Philippines in 1903. She later became an active member of the Philippine Independent Church.

Death 
She died at her daughter Saturnina's house in Banlat on February 19, 1919, at the age of 107. Her remains were first interred at the Mausoleum of the Veterans of the Revolution at the Manila North Cemetery. These were then transferred to the Himlayang Pilipino Memorial Park in Quezon City in 1970 and finally at the Tandang Sora National Shrine in 2012.

Legacy

As a token of gratitude, a Quezon City barangay and a road were named after Tandang Sora. Her profile was also placed in the Philippines' five-centavo coin from 1967-92. She was the first Filipina who appears on a Philippine peso banknote, in this case, a 100-peso bill from the English Series (1951–66). Tandang Sora Street in the city of San Francisco, California, USA, is named in her honor.

In 2012, on the celebration of her 200th birthday, the Local Government of Quezon City decided to transfer Tandang Sora's remains from Himlayang Pilipino Memorial Park to the Tandang Sora National Shrine in Quezon City. The city government also declared 2012 to be Tandang Sora Year.

Her descendants carry different surnames, with almost all living in Novaliches and Tandang Sora districts in Quezon City as well as in Guam such as Figueroa, Ramos (her husband’s surname), Geronimo, Eugenio, Cleofas and Apo.

A new Philippine Coast Guard 97-meter vessel was named after her, the BRP Melchora Aquino.

In popular culture
 Portrayed by Angelita Loresco in the 2013 TV series Katipunan.
 Portrayed by Erlinda Villalobos in the 2014 film Bonifacio: Ang Unang Pangulo.
 Referenced in the song “Babae” By Inang Laya

References

1812 births
1919 deaths
Filipino centenarians
Former Roman Catholics
People from Caloocan
Tagalog people
People of Spanish colonial Philippines
People of the Philippine Revolution
Women in war in the Philippines
Women in 19th-century warfare
Women centenarians
Filipino revolutionaries
Members of the Philippine Independent Church